Chryseobacterium culicis  is a Gram-negative and rod-shaped bacteria from the genus of Chryseobacterium which has been isolated from the midgut of the mosquito Culex quinquefasciatus in Raipur in the Chhattisgarh province in India.

References

Further reading

External links
Type strain of Chryseobacterium culicis at BacDive -  the Bacterial Diversity Metadatabase

culicis
Bacteria described in 2010